Jimbo's Inferno is a 2006 graphic novel created by Gary Panter and published by Fantagraphics Books. The "inferno" is a Los Angeles mall named Focky Bocky.

The contents are from Jimbo #7 (Zongo Comics, 1997), reformatted to fit the dimensions of its prequel story, Jimbo in Purgatory (Fantagraphics, 2004).  The two stories are loosely based on the first two books of Dante's Divine Comedy trilogy Inferno, Purgatorio, and Paradiso.

References
 
 New York Times Book Review, Sunday April 23, 2006.

2006 graphic novels
Comics based on poems
Hell in popular culture
Works based on Inferno (Dante)
Works based on Purgatorio